Aframomum longiligulatum is a species in the ginger family, Zingiberaceae. It was first described by Jean Koechlin.

Range
Aframomum longiligulatum is found in Cameroon in forests with Gilbertiodendron dewevrei up to 700 meters elevation.

References 

longiligulatum